Jimmy Chin (born 12 December 1955) is a Malaysian sports shooter. He competed in the mixed skeet event at the 1988 Summer Olympics.

References

External links
 

1955 births
Living people
Malaysian male sport shooters
Olympic shooters of Malaysia
Shooters at the 1988 Summer Olympics
Place of birth missing (living people)